The Book of Fatimah is, according to Shia tradition, attributed to Fatimah, the daughter of the Islamic prophet Muhammad. Fatimah occupies a similar position in Islam that Mary, mother of Jesus, occupies in Christianity. The Quranic praise for Mary in verse Q3:42 is often echoed for Fatimah in view of a sahih hadith that lists Fatimah, Khadija, Asiya, and Mary, mother of Jesus, as the outstanding women of all time.

As with Mary, there are reports that angels spoke to Fatimah on multiple occasions. In particular, in Shia view, the Book of Fatimah recounts the conversations of Gabriel with Fatimah to console her after Muhammad's death. Fatimah's husband, Ali, scribed the revelations. The book is said to contain prophecies about the future.

In Shia view, the Book of Fatimah has been preserved by the descendants of Fatimah, namely, the Shia Imams, and is now held by the last Shia Imam, Mahdi, whose advent is awaited by the Shia and Sunni alike, even though the two sects hold different views about Mahdi.

Content
The Book of Fatimah is specifically described as a text of heavenly origin dictated to Fatimah. Yet the traditionists emphasize that this book, occasionally described as being three times the size of the Quran, includes not even one letter from it. According to Ja'far al-Sadiq, the muṣḥaf Fāṭima (Book of Fatimah) does not contain information about legal matters, but only about future events. In one version, the future events described pertain to what will happen to Fatimah's descendants after her death.

The Book of Fatimah should be distinguished from another document known as Ṣaḥīfat al-Zahrāʾ (Fatimah’s scroll) which contained the names of the Twelve Imams and unlike other holy texts, it is cited in its entirety in a number of early Shiʿi sources.

Hidden Words
Bahá'u'lláh, the founder of the Bahai Faith, wrote Kalimat-i-Maknunih (Hidden Words) around 1857 CE. Bahá'u'lláh originally named his manuscript The Book of Fatimah. Bahais believe that The Hidden Words is the symbolic fulfilment of the Islamic prophecy.

See also
 List of Shia books
 Al-Jafr (book)
 Al-Jamia
 Al-Sahifa al-Sajjadiyya
 Nahj al-Balaghah
 Alleged attack on Fatimah's house
 Misconceptions about the Shia
 Hadith of Fatima tablet
 Bayt al-Ahzan
 Tasbih of Fatimah

References

Bibliography

External links
 Kitab Al-Kafi, Chapter 40 (Statements about al-Jafr, al-Jami‘ and the Book of Fatima (a.s.)), translated by Muhammad Sarwar
 Mushaf of Fatima on WikiShia

Islamic texts
Shia literature
Fatimah
7th-century Arabic books